4 Perry Street is a historic house in Brookline, Massachusetts, USA. It is locally significant as a well-preserved local example of Greek Revival styling.

Description 
The -story wood-frame building was built in 1843, and was one of the first houses built in the Linden Square development. It has a fully pedimented gable, with pilasters between each of the windows on the second level. The walls under the single-story porch are flushboarded, and the columns supporting the porch have a distinctive acanthus-leaf molding near the top.

The house was listed on the National Register of Historic Places on October 17, 1985.

See also
National Register of Historic Places listings in Brookline, Massachusetts

References

Houses completed in 1843
Houses in Brookline, Massachusetts
National Register of Historic Places in Brookline, Massachusetts
1843 establishments in Massachusetts
Houses on the National Register of Historic Places in Norfolk County, Massachusetts
Greek Revival houses in Massachusetts